Bob Bryan and Mike Bryan were the defending champions, but Daniel Nestor and Nenad Zimonjić defeated them 6–4, 5–7, [10–8], in the final.

Seeds
All seeds receive a bye into the second round.

Draw

Finals

Top half

Bottom half

External links
Draw

Doubles